The Battle of Santomé was a major battle during the years after the Dominican War of Independence and was fought on the 22 December 1855, in the province of San Juan. A detachment of Dominican troops forming part of the Army of the South, led by General José María Cabral, defeated an outnumbering force of the Haitian Army led by Antoine Pierrot. The Haitians met defeat on the same day at Cambronal.

1855–56 campaign
In November 1854, two Dominican warships captured a Haitian warship and bombarded two Haitian ports. In August 1855, the Dominican Navy lost four warships in a hurricane. In November 1855, Faustin Soulouque, having proclaimed himself Emperor Faustin I of the Haitian Empire, which he hoped to expand to include the Dominican Republic, invaded his neighbour again.

Dominicans struck back on the 22 December, in Santomé in the south. On the plain close to Las Matas, Dominican irregulars fought in pitched battle, wielding machetes and lances. Almost 700 Haitians fell that day, and the rest, many of them wounded, were forced to retreat as far back as the Fortress of Cachimán, and then beyond the border. The Haitians met defeat on the same day at Cambronal, and then a month later at Sabana Larga and Jácuba, in January 1856. Another rout at Savana Mula on Christmas Eve, a subsequent loss at Ouanaminthe, and a final defeat at Savana Larga spelled the end of Emperor Faustin I's dream of uniting Hispaniola under the Haitian flag.

Notes

References
 
 
 

1855 in the Dominican Republic
Santome
Santomé
December 1855 events
Santomé